I Know Your Troubles Been Long is the second studio album released by the band Mayday. The album was released on May 6, 2003, on Bar/None Records and Greyday Records. The album was recorded on an eight-track recorder in singer Ted Stevens' home.

Track list
Lone Star
Dyzfunctional Cuzin
Running Away
Lesson One for Children: Church/Steeple
Lost Serenade
Old Blood
From the Trapeze
Little Tremors
Virginia
Crawfish River
Lesson Two for Children: Making Biscuits
Lesson Three for Children: Listen, Listen
Laundromat
Lesson for Sisters and Daughters

See also
Ted Stevens (musician)
Mayday

References

External links
 Amazon

Folk albums by American artists
2003 albums
Mayday (American band) albums